The Good Son is the sixth album by Nick Cave and the Bad Seeds, released in 1990.

After two dark and harrowing albums with Your Funeral... My Trial (1986) and Tender Prey (1988), The Good Son was a substantial departure with a lighter and generally more uplifting sound. The change of mood was greatly inspired by singer Nick Cave falling in love with Brazilian journalist Viviane Carneiro, and an apparently salutary spell in rehab which purged much of the despair and squalor reflected in the previous two albums. Cave later said, "I guess The Good Son is some kind of reflection of the way I felt early on in Brazil. I was quite happy there. I was in love and the first year or two was good. The problem I found was ... in order to survive you have to adopt their attitudes towards everything, which are kind of blinkered."

Singles and release history
The Good Son was preceded by the release of "The Ship Song" single. A different version of "The Weeping Song" was later released as a single, with a different mix from the album version.

The closing track "Lucy" was resurrected in 1993 as a B-side of "What a Wonderful World", a collaboration of the Bad Seeds and the Pogues' Shane MacGowan.

The album was remastered and reissued on 29 March 2010 as a collector's edition CD/DVD set.

Track listing
All songs written by Nick Cave unless otherwise stated.

 "Foi Na Cruz"  – 5:39
 "The Good Son"  – 6:01
 "Sorrow's Child"  – 4:36
 "The Weeping Song"  – 4:21
 "The Ship Song"  – 5:14
 "The Hammer Song"  – 4:16
 "Lament"  – 4:51
 "The Witness Song"  – 5:57
 "Lucy"  – 4:17 (words: Cave; music: Cave, Bargeld, Roland Wolf)

Song details
"Foi Na Cruz" is based partly upon the traditional Brazilian Protestant hymn of the same title. The title translates roughly as "It Happened on the cross".

"The Good Son" - the opening chant is based loosely upon the African-American traditional song "Another Man Done Gone". A recording of this traditional song, by Odetta, later appeared on Original Seeds Vol. 1, a compilation of material that influenced Cave. The Biblical story of Cain and Abel is an obvious influence on the song, which describes a "a tiller and he has a tiller's hand" like Cain, a farmer who feuds with and kills his brother.

"The Witness Song" is based loosely upon the traditional American gospel song "Who Will be a Witness?".

The single mix of "The Weeping Song" is a different mix than the one found on the album.

Four of the songs on the album were left with their working titles ("The Ship Song", "The Weeping Song", "The Hammer Song", "The Witness Song").

The instrumental b-side "Cocks 'n' Asses" was retitled "The B-side Song" for the USA release.

Singles
 "The Ship Song" (MUTE 108) (12 March 1990)
 b/w: "The Train Song"
 "The Weeping Song" (MUTE 118) (17 September 1990)
 b/w: "Cocks 'n' Asses" / "Helpless"

Personnel
Nick Cave and the Bad Seeds
 Nick Cave – vocals, piano, Hammond organ, harmonica
 Mick Harvey – bass, acoustic guitar, vibraphone, percussion, backing vocals; all guitars on "The Hammer Song"
 Blixa Bargeld – guitar, backing vocals, co-lead "Father" vocals on "The Weeping Song"
 Kid Congo Powers – guitar
 Thomas Wydler – drums, percussion
with:
 Roland Wolf - piano on reprise section of "Lucy"
 Clóvis Trindade, Rubinho - vocals on "Foi Na Cruz"

String Section
Alexandre Ramirez, Altamir Téa Bueno Salinas, Helena Akiku Imasoto, Léa Kalil Sadi - violin
Akira Terazaki, Glauco Masahiro Imasato - viola
Braulio Marques Lima, Cristina Manescu - cello
Cláudia Ferreti - string and singer coordinator
Mick Harvey and Billy McGee - string arrangements

References

1990 albums
Nick Cave albums
Mute Records albums
Albums produced by Gareth Jones (music producer)
Albums produced by Flood (producer)